The fulvous antshrike (Frederickena fulva) is a monotypic species of antbird in the family Thamnophilidae. Formerly considered to be a subspecies of the undulated antshrike, it was determined to be a distinct species based on vocal differences. The species occurs from the western Amazon in eastern Ecuador, south-eastern Colombia, north-eastern Peru, and possibly extreme western Brazil. Only the female is overall fulvous with dark barring; the male is black with whitish barring.

References

Thamnophilidae
Birds of the Colombian Amazon
Birds of the Ecuadorian Amazon
Birds of the Peruvian Amazon
Birds described in 1905
Taxa named by John T. Zimmer